The Wurrugu language, or Wurango, also known as the Popham Bay language, is an extinct Australian Aboriginal language. It is known from just a few 19th-century wordlists and one rememberer.

References

Evans, N. (1996). First and last notes on Wurrugu. University of Melbourne Working Papers in Linguistics, 16, 91–98.

Extinct languages of the Northern Territory
Languages attested from the 19th century
Marrku–Wurrugu languages